Al-Suqoor FC  is a Saudi Arabian football (soccer) team in Tabuk playing at the Saudi Third Division.

Current squad 
As of Saudi Second Division:

Notable players
Fahad Abo Jaber
Sultan Al-Balawi
Aiedh Al-Joni
Ahmed Al-Suhail
Saod Al-Kaebari

References

Football clubs in Saudi Arabia
Association football clubs established in 1965
1965 establishments in Saudi Arabia
Football clubs in Tabuk, Saudi Arabia